Poznań Górczyn railway station is a railway station serving the south west of the city of Poznań, in the Greater Poland Voivodeship, Poland. The station opened in 1870 and is located on the Warsaw–Kunowice railway. The train services are operated by Przewozy Regionalne and Koleje Wielkopolskie. From this station there is also a line used by freight trains which joins the Kluczbork–Poznań railway.

The station opened as Poznań Święty Łazarz and underwent modernisation in 1976.

Train services
The station is served by the following service(s):

Regional services (R) Zielona Gora - Zbaszynek - Zbąszyn - Opalenica - Poznan
Regional services (KW) Zbaszynek - Zbąszyn - Opalenica - Poznan

Tram services
3 (Górczyn - Poznań Główny - Rondo Rataje - Rondo Śródka - Male Garbary - Armii Poznań - Wilczak)
5 (Górczyn - Poznań Główny - City Centre - Os. Lecha - Zegrze - Stomil)
8 (Górczyn - Poznań Główny - Male Garbary - Rondo Śródka - Miłostowo)
14 (Górczyn - Poznań Główny - Os. Sobieskiego)

Bus services

49
50
63
75
80
82
93
610
614
616
701
702
703
704
710

References

 This article is based upon a translation of the Polish language version as of June 2016.

External links

 

Górczyn
Railway stations in Greater Poland Voivodeship
Railway stations served by Przewozy Regionalne InterRegio
Railway stations in Poland opened in 1870